Kazumi Nakamura (born February 24, 1971) is a Japanese former volleyball player who competed in the 1992 Summer Olympics and in the 1996 Summer Olympics.

In 1992 she finished fifth with the Japanese team in the Olympic tournament.

She was a member of the Japanese team that was eliminated in the preliminary round of the 1996 Olympic tournament.

External links
 

1971 births
Living people
Japanese women's volleyball players
Olympic volleyball players of Japan
Volleyball players at the 1992 Summer Olympics
Volleyball players at the 1996 Summer Olympics